Compendium ferculorum, albo Zebranie potraw (A Collection of Dishes) is a cookbook by Stanisław Czerniecki. First put in print in 1682, it is the earliest known cookery book published originally in Polish. Czerniecki wrote it in his capacity as head chef at the court of the house of Lubomirski and dedicated it to Princess Helena Tekla Lubomirska. The book contains more than 300 recipes, divided into three chapters of about 100 recipes each.

The chapters are devoted, respectively, to meat, fish and other dishes, and each concludes with a "master chef's secret". Czerniecki's cooking style, as is evident in his book, was typical for the luxuriant Polish Baroque cuisine, which still had a largely medieval outlook, but was gradually succumbing to novel culinary ideas coming from France. It was characterized by generous use of vinegar, sugar and exotic spices, as well as preference for spectacle over thrift.

The book was republished several times during the 18th and 19th centuries, sometimes under new titles, and had an important impact on the development of Polish cuisine. It also served as an inspiration for the portrayal of an Old Polish banquet in Pan Tadeusz, the Polish national epic.

Context 

Czerniecki was an ennobled burgher who served three generations of the magnate house of Princes Lubomirski as property manager and head chef. He began his service in ca. 1645, initially under Stanisław Lubomirski until 1649, then under the latter's eldest son, Aleksander Michał Lubomirski, and his grandson, Józef Karol Lubomirski. Although Czerniecki's book was first published in 1682, it must have been completed before Aleksander Michał Lubomirski's death in 1677.

The original publication of Compendium ferculorum came three decades after the French cookbook entitled  (The French [male] Cook, 1651), by François Pierre de La Varenne, started a culinary revolution that spread across Europe in the second half of the 17th century. In this new wave of French gastronomy, exotic spices were largely replaced with domestic herbs with the aim of highlighting the natural flavours of foods. Compendium ferculorum, written in Polish and promoting traditional domestic cuisine, which maintained a largely medieval outlook, may be seen as Czerniecki's response to the onslaught of culinary cosmopolitanism.

Content

Title and dedication 
Although the book is written entirely in Polish, it has a bilingual, Latin and Polish, title. Compendium ferculorum and  both mean "a collection of dishes", in Latin and Polish, respectively; these are joined by the Polish conjunction albo, "or".

The work opens with Czerniecki's dedication to his "most charitable lady and benefactress", Princess  née , recalling a famed banquet given to Pope Urban VIII by her father, Prince , during his diplomatic mission to Rome in 1633. Ossoliński's legation was famous for its ostentatious sumptuousness designed to show off the grandeur and prosperity of the Polish–Lithuanian Commonwealth, even to the point of deliberately fitting his mount with loose golden horseshoes, only to lose them while ceremoniously entering the Eternal City. The dedication, in which Czerniecki pointed out he had already served the house of Lubomirski for 32 years, also mentions Lubomirska's husband, and their son, wishing the whole family good health and good fortune.

The author was well aware that his was the first cookbook in the Polish vernacular, which he made clear in the dedication. "As no one before me has yet wished to present to the world such useful knowledge in our Polish language," he wrote in his opening line, "I have dared, ... despite my ineptitude, to offer the Polish world my compendium ferculorum, or collection of dishes." However, no copies of this supposed translation have survived, except for facsimiles of two folios, published in 1891, of uncertain authenticity. Whatever the case, Czerniecki's work is without a doubt the oldest known cookbook published originally in Polish.

Inventory 
The dedication is followed by a detailed inventory of food items, kitchenware, as well as kitchen and waiting staff, necessary for hosting a banquet. The list of food items begins with meats of farm animals and game, including sundry game birds, from snow bunting to great bustard. Different kinds of cereals and pasta are followed by an enumeration of fruits and mushrooms which may be either fresh or dried. The list of vegetables includes, now largely forgotten, cardoon, Jerusalem artichoke and turnip-rooted chervil, or popie jajka (literally, "priest's balls"), as Czerniecki calls it. Under the heading of "spices" come not only saffron, black pepper, ginger, cinnamon, cloves, nutmeg, mace and cumin, all of which were used abundantly in Czerniecki's cookery, but also powdered sugar, rice, "large" and "small" raisins, citrus fruits such as lemons, limes and oranges, and even smoked ham and smoked beef tongue, which were also used as seasonings.

Advice 
Next, the author presents his views and advice regarding the role of kuchmistrz, or "master chef". Czerniecki clearly took pride from his role as a chef, which he understood as incorporating those of an artist and a mentor to younger cooks. According to him, a good chef should be "well-groomed, sober, attentive, loyal and, most of all, supportive to his lord and quick."

He should be neat and tidy, with a good head of hair, well-combed, short at the back and sides; he should have clean hands, his fingernails should be trimmed, he should wear a white apron; he should not be quarrelsome, he should be sober, submissive, brisk; he should have a good understanding of flavor, a sound knowledge of ingredients and utensils, together with a willingness to serve everyone.

Czerniecki concludes these introductory remarks with an admonition against sprinkling food with bread crumbs and by avowing to focus on "Old Polish dishes" to let the reader experience domestic cuisine before moving on to foreign specialties.

Structure 
The main part of the book follows a well-thought-out structure. It is divided into three chapters, each containing one hundred numbered recipes, followed by an appendix (additament) of ten additional numbered recipes and an extra special recipe called a "master chef's secret" (sekret kuchmistrzowski). Thus, ostensibly, each chapter consists of 111 recipes, giving a total of 333. The first chapter, opening with a recipe for "Polish broth" (rosół polski), is devoted to meat dishes. The second contains recipes for fish dishes, including one for beaver tail, which was considered a fish for the purposes of Catholic dietary law. The final chapter is more diverse and presents recipes for dairy dishes, pies, tarts and cakes, as well as soups (omitted from the chapter's title).

The actual number of recipes deviates from that claimed by the author. On the one hand, there may be more than one recipe under a single numbered heading. For example, under number 4 in chapter 1, there are three disparate recipes, one for stewed meat in saffron sauce, one for a thick sauce of sieved vegetables and one for boiled meatballs, as well as a tip to add raisins only to those dishes that are meant to be sweet. Chapter 2 opens with five unnumbered recipes for sauces to be used with fish. On the other hand, some of the numbered headings are not followed by any actual recipe, serving only to reiterate that various dishes may be prepared using the same basic technique. For instance, in chapter 3, the recipe for a puff-pastry apple tart, is followed by eleven numbered headings saying, "pear tart likewise", "woodland strawberry tart likewise", "sour cherry tart likewise", and so on for fig, prune, date, gooseberry, peach, plum, currant and quince tarts.

Approach

Writing 
The instructions in Compendium ferculorum are succinct and often vague, lacking such elements of modern culinary recipes as lists of ingredients used, measurements or proportions, and cooking times. The underlying assumption is that they are to be used by a professional chef rather than a person with little cooking experience. The recipe for stewed meat in saffron sauce, cited below, is typical is this regard.

All recipes are written in the second-person singular imperative, a grammatical form that would not have been used to address a person of high rank. The instructions were most likely meant to be read aloud by the chef or one of senior cooks to junior members of the kitchen staff, who would carry them out. This style contrasts with the less direct, impersonal way of addressing the reader, characterized by infinitive verb forms, used in 19th-century Polish cookbooks.

Cooking 
Czerniecki's cooking style, as presented in his book, is characterized by aristocratic lavishness, Baroque pageantry and fiery combinations of contrasting flavours. When it comes to spending, the author cautions against both waste and unnecessary thrift.

A banquet was meant to overwhelm the guests with lavishness and flaunt the host's wealth and munificence. Abundant use of expensive spices was one way to accomplish this. Black pepper, ginger, saffron, cinnamon, cloves, mace and nutmeg were added to most dishes by kilograms. Czerniecki counted sugar among spices and used it as such; his book contains few recipes for desserts, but sugar is used profusely in recipes for meat, fish and egg dishes. Vinegar was also used in copious amounts. Such fusion of excessively piquant, sweet and sour tastes, which modern Poles would likely find inedible, was typical of Old Polish cuisine, described by Czerniecki as "saffrony and peppery".

A dish that succeeded to puzzle or surprise the diners was considered the greatest achievement of culinary sophistication. The "secrets", divulged at the end of each chapter, provide examples of such recipes. One is for a capon in a bottle; the trick was to skin the bird, place the skin inside a bottle, fill it with a mixture of milk and eggs, and put the bottle into boiling water. As the mixture expanded in heat, it produced an illusion of a whole capon fit inside a bottle. Another "secret" is a recipe for an uncut pike with its head fried, its tail baked and its middle boiled; it was made by spit-roasting the fish while basting its head with oil or butter and sprinkling it with flour, and pouring salted vinegar on cloth wrapped around the middle part. The last recipe is for a broth boiled with a string of pearls and a golden coin, which was supposed to cure the sick and those "despairing about their health".

Czerniecki's goal was to present what he called "Old Polish dishes" as opposed to foreign recipes. He did, however, reference foreign influences throughout the book, particularly from French cuisine and from what he referred to as "Imperial cuisine", that is, the cooking styles of Bohemia and Hungary, then both part of the Habsburg Empire. He displays an ambivalent attitude to French cookery; on the one hand, he dismisses French , or creamy soups, as alien to Polish culture and criticizes the use of wine in cooking. "Every dish may be cooked without wine", he wrote, "it suffices to season it with vinegar and sweetness."

Legacy

Culinary 
For over a century after its first edition, Compendium ferculorum remained the only printed cookbook in Polish. It was only in 1783 that a new Polish-language cookbook – Kucharz doskonały (The Perfect [male] Cook) by Wojciech Wielądko – was published. Its first edition was little more than an abridged translation of La cuisinière bourgeoise (The Urban [female] Cook) by Menon, a popular French cookbook, first published in 1746. One part of Kucharz doskonały, however, was based directly on Czerniecki's work. Wielądko chose not to translate the glossary of culinary terms included in Menon's book; instead, he appended to the cookbook his own glossary, which explained the culinary terms (and, in some cases, quoted entire recipes) found in Compendium ferculorum. This way, Kucharz doskonały combined French cuisine, which was then storming into fashion in Poland, with Old Polish cookery, exemplified by Czerniecki's book. In the third edition, in 1800, Wielądko included even more time-honoured Polish and German recipes, creating an amalgam of national culinary tradition and new French cuisine, and thus laying the groundwork for modern Polish cookery.

Literary 

In 1834, Compendium ferculorum served as an inspiration to Adam Mickiewicz for his nostalgic description of "the last Old Polish feast" in Pan Tadeusz, a mock heroic poem set in the years 1811–1812, which has come to be revered as the Polish national epic. In his account of the fictional banquet in Book 12, the poet included the names of several dishes found in the oldest Polish cookbook, such as "royal borscht", as well as two of the master chef's secrets: the broth with pearls and a coin, and the three-way fish.

To underscore that the feast represents an exotic bygone world of pre-partition Poland, Mickiewicz added to this a list of random dishes, ingredients and additives, whose names he found in Compendium ferculorum and which had already been forgotten in his own time: kontuza (soup of boiled and sieved meat), arkas (sweet milk-based jelly), blemas (blancmange), pomuchla (Atlantic cod), figatele (meatballs), cybeta (civet), piżmo (musk), dragant (tragacanth), pinele (pine nuts) and brunele (prunes). This is followed by a similar enumeration of various kinds of fish, whose names are likewise taken from the inventory at the beginning of Czerniecki's book. A description of a white-apron-clad chef and a reference to Prince Ossoliński's banquet in Rome, both found in Book 11, are also clearly inspired by Czerniecki's characterization of a master chef and his dedication, respectively.

What is intriguing about this literary link between the oldest Polish cookbook and the national epic is that Mickiewicz apparently confused the title of Czerniecki's work with that of Wielądko's Kucharz doskonały, both in the poem itself and in the poet's explanatory notes. Whether this is a result of the author's mistake or poetic license, remains a matter of scholarly dispute. According to the poet's friend, Antoni Edward Odyniec, Mickiewicz never parted with an "old and torn book" entitled Doskonały kucharz, which he carried in his personal traveling library. Stanisław Pigoń, a historian of Polish literature, has suggested that it was actually a copy of Czerniecki's book, which happened to be missing its title page, so Mickiewicz was familiar with the contents of Compendium ferculorum, but not with its title, and confounded it with Wielądko's cookbook.

Publishing history 
The original edition of 1682 was the only publication of Czerniecki's cookbook during his lifetime. After his death, however, Compendium ferculorum was republished about 20 times until 1821. Some of the later editions were published under new titles, reflecting a broadening of the target readership.

The second edition, published in 1730, was very similar to the first, with only minor revisions. Both editions were printed in blackletter type and in quarto book format; later editions were printed in roman type and in octavo.

The third edition, published in Wilno (now Vilnius, Lithuania) in 1744, was the first to be printed outside Kraków. It was also the first edition to be given a new title, Stół obojętny, to jest pański, a oraz i chudopacholski (The Indifferent Table, that is, Both Lordly and Common). The Sandomierz edition of 1784, under the latter title, was expanded with forty new recipes for sauces, gingerbread, vinegar and other condiments. This addition, copied from Compendium medicum, a popular 18th-century Polish medical reference book, differed in both writing and cooking style from Czerniecki's original work, and did not reappear in subsequent editions.

Editions from the first quarter of the 19th century, published in Warsaw and Berdyczów (now Berdychiv, Ukraine) use yet another title, Kucharka miejska i wiejska (The Urban and Rural [female] Cook). These changes in title indicate that the cooking style promoted by the Lubomirskis' head chef, originally associated with fine dining at a magnate court, eventually became part of the culinary repertoire of housewives in towns and countryside throughout Poland.

Renewed popular interest in Old Polish cuisine has resulted in reprints being made since the turn of the 21st century, including a limited bibliophile edition of 500 numbered leather-bound volumes published in 2002 in Jędrzejów. In 2009, the Wilanów Palace Museum in Warsaw published a critical edition with a broad introduction by food historian Jarosław Dumanowski presenting Czerniecki's life and work.

List of editions 

 
 
  (2nd ed. 1775, 3rd ed. 1782, 4th ed. 1788)
 
  (2nd ed. 1757)
  Enlarged with 40 additional recipes.
  (2nd ed. 1804, 3rd ed. 1806 in Berdyczów, 4th ed. 1811, 5th ed. 1816, 6th ed. 1821)
  (2nd ed. 2004)
  Limited bibliophile edition.
  (2nd ed. 2010, 3rd ed. 2012)
  Photo-offset reprint of the 1682 edition.

Translations 
This translation was never published and is only known from a manuscript held at the Russian State Library in Moscow (another manuscript Russian translation of Czerniecki's work is possibly held at the National Library of Russia in Saint Petersburg). In 2014, an English version of the Wilanów edition was published; the publication of a French translation is also planned.

Notes

References

Sources 

 
 
 
 

External links 
 Compendium ferculorum, a complete scan of the first edition at Polona.pl, a digital library run by the National Library of Poland

1682 books
Early Modern cookbooks
Polish cuisine